This is a list of the preserved colonial buildings in Santo Domingo, capital of the Dominican Republic.

Santo Domingo is the oldest continuously inhabited European settlement in the Americas; for this reason, according to the UNESCO, many buildings are the first of their kind in the Americas, for example is home to the oldest Catholic building in continuous use in the Americas, the headquarters of the first university in the Americas or the first cathedral in the Americas, etc.

"Colonial City of Santo Domingo" is a UNESCO World Heritage Site since 1990.

List

References

 
Lists of oldest buildings and structures
Lists of churches
History of Santo Domingo
Spanish Colonial architecture in the Dominican Republic
Architecture lists
colonial buildings in Santo Domingo
colonial buildings in Santo Domingo